Michael Evans Behling (born March 5, 1996) is an American actor. He is best known for his role as Jordan Baker on All American.

Early life
Behling was born in Columbus, Ohio and adopted by Mike and Carol Behling, but grew up in Columbus, Indiana. He is biracial and was adopted by a white family. In a March 2020 YouTube video, he stated that his father is of Nigerian descent and his mother is of German descent and that his last name is German. He has three siblings, Matt, Adam, and Andrea. Behling's family owned ten acres of land, several dogs and cats and a chicken coop. Sports were a big part of his life growing up, and Behling played baseball, soccer, and volleyball.

He first thought about being an actor when he was a freshman in high school and was inspired by Heath Ledger's performance in The Dark Knight. Behling attended Columbus North High School, where he played football for two years and ran track. He was on the honor roll and graduated in 2015. Behling continued to run track in college, competing in the 400-meter hurdles. He stopped competing in track after breaking his foot twice, which required two surgeries. He attended Indiana State University for two years as a pre-med student before dropping out to pursue modeling and acting. Prior to beginning his acting career, he worked as an assistant director at the Donner Aquatic Center in Columbus, Indiana.

Career
While in college, Behling began modeling, and eventually his team convinced him to audition for acting roles. He did several advertising campaigns with Adidas and White Castle. Behling began his career in television in 2017 with a role as "Handsome Dude" on Empire. In March 2018, he was cast as Jordan Baker on All American, and filming for the pilot began two weeks later. Behling moved to Los Angeles in January 2018 when filming began, and after his finances ran low he began sleeping on a friend's floor. He has said that he identifies with his character because they are both biracial and looking for the place where they fit in. His role as Jordan Baker is his breakout role. He is currently represented by HRI Talent and Management 101.

Behling has a clothing line, DesignedAt5AM, which he started with three friends from high school (Nicholas Stevens, Drew Thompson, and Floyd Athaide). The clothing line was inspired by his desire to start his day early to accomplish his goals and by his high school friends' early morning swim practices. He also has appeared on The Wayne Ayers Podcast.

Personal life
Behling lives in Los Angeles. He actively advocates for animal rights and mental health awareness. He and costar Daniel Ezra are friends and frequently hang out after filming.

Filmography

References

External links 
 
 
 

1996 births
Living people
People from Columbus, Indiana
American fashion businesspeople
21st-century American male actors
American male television actors
Male actors from Indiana
American people of German descent
American people of Nigerian descent
Indiana State University alumni
Male models from Indiana